Plaisance is an unincorporated community in St. Landry Parish, Louisiana, United States. It is the location of the Plaisance School, which is listed on the National Register of Historic Places.

It is home to the Southwest Louisiana Zydeco Music Festival.

Notable people
James A. Joseph (born 1935), former United States Ambassador to South Africa
O'Neil Ray Collins (1931-1989), botanist and mycologist

References

Unincorporated communities in St. Landry Parish, Louisiana
Unincorporated communities in Louisiana